Miramella alpina, the 'Green Mountain Grasshopper', is a species of 'short-horned grasshoppers' belonging to the family Acrididae subfamily Melanoplinae.

Subspecies
 Miramella alpina var. alpina  (Kollar, 1833) 
 Miramella alpina var. subalpina  (Fischer, 1850) 
 Miramella alpina var. albanica  Mishchenko, L.L., 1952  - Galvagniella albanica  Mishchenko, L.L., 1952 
 Miramella alpina var. collina  (Brunner von Wattenwyl, 1864)  - Miramella alpina var. alpina  (Kollar, 1833)

Distribution
This common alpine grasshopper is present in Austria, Belgium, Czech Republic, France, Germany, Italy, Poland, Spain and Switzerland.

Description
The basic coloration of the body is bright green in both sexes, with longitudinal black stripes at the sides of pronotum, extended to the abdomen in males. The light-brown wings usually are very reduced and unfit to flight (brachyptery). Femora of the hind legs are red on the bottom, while tibiae are yellowish in the females and black in males.

Biology and behavior
They can be encountered from late June through September, mainly in moist mountain meadows, wet clearings and open woods. They feed on grasses, lichens, mosses and various herbaceous plants, with a preference for Vaccinium species.

References
Citations

Bibliography
 Galvagni A., 1986 - The situation of the genus Miramella Dovnar-Zapolskij, 1933, in the Balcanic and Carpathic regions (Insecta: Caelifera: Catantopidae). Studi Trentini di Scienze Naturali, Acta Biol. 62
 Roman Asshoff and Stephan Hättenschwiler - Growth and reproduction of the alpine grasshopper Miramella alpina feeding on CO 2-enriched dwarf shrubs at treeline - Oecologia 142, Number 2, 191-201
 Kral K., 2008 - Similarities and differences in the peering-jump behavior of three grasshopper species (Orthoptera, Caelifera). Insect Science 15, 369-374
 Kral K., 2009 - Comparison of the use of active vision for depth perception in three grasshopper families (Orthoptera: Caelifera). Annals of the Entomological Society of America 102, 339-345

External links
 Fauna Europaea
 Biolib
 Orthoptera Species
 Www1.0su.cz

Acrididae
Insects described in 1833
Orthoptera of Europe